The Toyota Aygo X is a crossover city car produced by Toyota since 2022. Using the Aygo nameplate, it is primarily marketed for the European market. It is built at the Toyota Motor Manufacturing Czech Republic (TMMCZ, formerly known as TPCA) plant in Kolín, Czech Republic, and replaces the previous Aygo hatchback produced in two generations from 2005 to 2021.

Overview 
The vehicle was previewed by the "" concept car, which was presented on 17 March 2021. The concept car was designed by Toyota Motor Europe ED² design center in Sophia-Antipolis, France, while the production version was designed by Toyota Motor Europe design center of Zaventem, Belgium. The latter was presented on 5 November. The "X" is pronounced "Cross" to define the vehicle as a crossover, similar to the Yaris Cross and the Corolla Cross. The Aygo X is marketed as a higher-end vehicle in the A-segment class.

Aygo X Air Edition
The Toyota Aygo X Air Edition is a special edition available in the UK, offering more options along with a canvas roof. It will be available exclusively online via the Toyota UK website.

Concept 
The Toyota Aygo X was prefigured by the Aygo X Prologue concept car presented on March 17, 2021.

Specifications 
The Aygo X is built on the shortened version of the GA-B platform. The platform therefore differs from the first two generations of the Aygo, which were produced at the TMMCZ plant in Kolín, Czech Republic, where the Aygo X is also produced. The 1.0-litre 1KR-B52 engine is retained from the previous Aygo models.

Engines

Safety

Euro NCAP
The Aygo X in its standard European configuration received 4 stars from Euro NCAP in 2022.

References

External links 

 

Aygo X
Cars introduced in 2021
Mini sport utility vehicles
Crossover sport utility vehicles
City cars
Front-wheel-drive vehicles
Vehicles with CVT transmission
Euro NCAP superminis